John Lawrence (born 17 July 1975) is a Welsh musician. He was a founding member of Gorky's Zygotic Mynci, but left the band in 1999, prior to the release of the band's sixth album Spanish Dance Troupe. As a solo artist, he has sometimes gone by the name Infinity Chimps.

In early 2011, Lawrence recorded a session for Adam Walton on BBC Introducing, backed by the then-new band Shy and the Fight.

In 2013, he released new material in collaboration with singer Jaci Williams. He has also been producing Tree of Wolves's material.

Lawrence produced folk musician Chris Jones's debut album, Dacw'r Tannau, released in September 2014. He has also worked with Band Pres Llareggub on their first EP, which was released in April 2015, and with Nia Morgan on her upcoming new album.

Lawrence released solo material, Songs from the Precipice, on 7 September 2015 via his website, followed by Narcissus Paradox in 2019. His style on later output has been likened to Frank Zappa.
He makes occasional public appearances, including 9 Volt Sessions (twice, 4 September 2014 and 29 June 2015) and also a live session on Neil Crud's Tudno FM radio show on 20 June 2016.

In 2017, he produced Welsh singer-songwriter, Scott Marsden's solo EP Scars at Penhesgyn Studio, where he continues to work as the in-house engineer with former Bryn Derwen Studio owner, Laurie Gane.

In 2021 He continued to work with Welsh singer-songwriter Scott Marsden on Holy Coves' third studio album titled Druids and Bards, working with producers and musicians Erik Wofford, Owain Ginsberg, Spike T. Smith and Jason Hughes. Lawrence produced, engineered and featured on guitar on the record. 
The album is due to be released in 2022 via Welsh independent record label Yr Wyddfa Records based in Snowdonia.

Discography
as John Lawrence
 Rainy Night, Lawrence Music, 2009
 Songs from the Precipice, Lawrence Music, 2015
 Narcissus Paradox, Lawrence Music, 2019

as Infinity Chimps
 Sounds of Nant Y Benglog, Ankstmusik / Lawrence Music, 2002
 Infinity Chimps, Sylem Records, 2000

References

External links
Official website
Official bandcamp page
Fan site with news/photos/discography

Living people
Welsh rock musicians
Welsh-speaking musicians
People educated at Bro Myrddin Welsh Comprehensive School
1975 births